The International Journal of American Linguistics (IJAL) is an academic journal devoted to the study of the indigenous languages of the Americas. IJAL focuses on the investigation of linguistic data and the presentation of grammatical fragments and other documents relevant to Amerindian languages.

History
The journal was established in 1917 by anthropologist Franz Boas. it has been published by the University of Chicago Press since 1974.

References

External links
  International Journal of American Linguistics homepage
International Journal of American Linguistics-SJR

Linguistics journals
University of Chicago Press academic journals
Publications established in 1917
Quarterly journals
English-language journals